Prime Time is an Australian soap opera drama television series produced by Crawford Productions that aired on the Nine Network in from January 1986 to January 1987. Prime Time was the last Australian soap produced with exterior location scenes shot on film and interior scenes shot on videotape. The series was not a popular success and was cancelled after sixty episodes.

Premise 
The series was set at a fictional television station, Channel 5, and dealt with the behind-the-scenes goings-on on the set of a current affairs series called Assignment.

Cast 
 Chris Orchard – David Lockhart
 Anthony Hawkins – Harry Jones
 Nina Landis – Kate Macarthur
 Peter Kowitz – Jim Donnegan
 David Whitney – Stephen Lockhart
 Julianne White – Diana Fields
 Peter Whitford – Charles Garrett
 Gary Sweet – Craig Lawrence
 Sonja Tallis – Georgina Jones
 Tottie Goldsmith – Jamie
 Katrina Foster – Jocelyn Cole
 Ben Mendelsohn – Bart Jones
 John Hannan – John Balenko
 Jane Hall – Sandy Lockhart
 Kathy Caswell – Carol Foster
 Antonia Murphy – Kylie Garrett

External links
Crawford Productions
 
Prime Time at the National Film and Sound Archive

1986 Australian television series debuts
1987 Australian television series endings
1990s Australian television series
Australian drama television series
Australian television soap operas
English-language television shows
Nine Network original programming
Television series by Crawford Productions